Macará Canton is a canton of Ecuador, located in the Loja Province.  Its capital is the town of Macará.  Its population at the 2001 census was 18,350.

The Macará River runs through the canton.

Demographics
Ethnic groups as of the Ecuadorian census of 2010:
Mestizo  90.5%
White  4.7%
Afro-Ecuadorian  4.2%
Montubio  0.3%
Indigenous  0.1%
Other  0.1%

References

Cantons of Loja Province